Somewhere Between Right and Wrong is the third studio album by American country music artist Earl Thomas Conley. It was released on August 16, 1982 via RCA Records. The album includes the singles "Heavenly Bodies", "Somewhere Between Right and Wrong" and "I Have Loved You Girl (But Not Like This Before)".

Track listing

Chart performance

References

1982 albums
Earl Thomas Conley albums
RCA Records albums